Pernic Bluff is an ice-covered bluff, 1060 m, at the south end of Kelly Plateau and Carlstrom Foothills in Churchill Mountains. The bluff rises 700 m above the terminus of Flynn Glacier at the junction with Starshot Glacier. Named by Advisory Committee on Antarctic Names (US-ACAN) after Robert J. Pernic, electrical engineer, University of Chicago Herkes Observatory, Williams Bay, WI; team leader for polar operations in support of CARA-wide projects at the United States Antarctic Program (USAP) Center for Astrophysical Research in Antarctica at the South Pole Station, 1991–2002.

References
 

Cliffs of Oates Land